Pauline Lhote is a French female winemaker based in Napa, California, known for sparkling wine. She is the current lead sparkling winemaker at Domaine Chandon.

Lhote grew up on a farm in Champagne and earned a degree at the University of Reims Champagne-Ardenne in Reims.  Upon graduation, Lhote worked at Moët & Chandon and Nicolas Feuillate in France.  In those roles, she performed maturity controls, winemaking trials and cellar work. While at Moët & Chandon, she spent time creating red wines used in producing rosé sparkling wines, including Dom Perignon Rosé.

Lhote came to the United States for a three-month internship at Chandon in Napa, California and stayed on as a permanent employee. Lhote now leads the team that creates Chandon's sparkling wines.

References

External links 
 Lhote Biography on Chandon.com
 Lhote mentioned on ChandonUSA's Twitter

American viticulturists
American winemakers
Living people
American female winemakers
Wine merchants
Year of birth missing (living people)